Kerala Congress is an Indian political party founded at Kottayam, Kerala in October, 1964, by a block of former Indian National Congress leaders led by K. M. George. The party is primarily active in central Kerala.

The establishment of Kerala Congress could be traced to resignation and later death of P. T. Chacko, the Home Minister in the R. Sankar-led Congress ministry (1962–64). Fifteen rebel Congress Members of the Legislative Assembly subsequently supported a successful no confidence motion on the Sankar ministry. K. M. George and R. Balakrishna Pillai, backed by the Catholic Church and the Nair Service Society leader Mannathu Padmanabha Pillai, formed "Kerala Congress" at Kottayam on 9 October 1964.

History 

 "Kerala Congress" was formed as a breakaway faction from Indian National Congress in 1964 (led by K. M. George and R. Balakrishna Pillai). The party won 26 seats in the 1965 Kerala Assembly election.
 George and Pillai were arrested and imprisoned during the National Emergency.
 Kerala Congress joined the C. Achutha Menon-led Kerala ministry in 1975 (R. Balakrishna Pillai and K. M. Mani as ministers). R. Balakrishna Pillai was later replaced by K. M. George (died 1976).
 Kerala Congress (B), led by R. Balakrishna Pillai and later with the Left alliance, was formed in 1977.
 K. M. Mani, with the Congress alliance, served as the Home Minister in the later K. Karunakaran and A. K. Antony led ministries (replaced in between by P. J. Joseph).
 Kerala Congress (Mani) was formed from Kerala Congress in 1979.

Kerala Congress (P.J Joseph Era) (1979-2010) 

However Splinter fractions of R. Balakrishna Pillai and K. M. Mani Merged with parent Kerala Congress Led By P. J. Joseph On 1985.

But these parties again split in 1987 by K, M Mani, after the split 1987 there is a big legal battle for the name and symbol between P.J Joseph and K.M Mani and the court was ruled in favor of PJ Joseph. In 1989 R Balakrishnan Pillai also left Parent Kerala Congress.

P.J Joseph was minister several times Until 2010 representing Kerala Congress

Merger with Kerala Congress (M) and Dissolution (2010-2015) 
In 2010 one of the founder's sons, P. C. Thomas, joined the Party. He was a Kerala Congress (M) member until 2001 and later formed his own party, the IFDP.

Later that year, Kerala Congress  and Kerala Congress (M) decide to merge into one party. P. C. Thomas did not support this merger and made his own fraction called Kerala Congress (Anti-merger Group).

Eventually, the Kerala Election Commission froze the party's name and symbol, thereby dissolving Kerala Congress.

Revival of Kerala Congress  (2016-Present)

Alliance with NDA (P.C Thomas Era (2016-2021)) 
P.C Thomas was a chairman of Kerala Congress (Anti-merger Group). since 2014 a power struggle erupted on that party . on 2015 Thomas left Kerala Congress (Anti-merger Group) and form Kerala Congress (Thomas) but Left Democratic Front (Kerala) did not approve this split. and kicked out Thomas from their alliance.

In 2015 August, the Kerala Congress faction led by P. C. Thomas join the Kerala unit of the Bharatiya Janata Party-led National Democratic Alliance (NDA).

In 2016, After a long legal battle P. C. Thomas Received approval to use the name as bracket less Kerala Congress party. So Thomas dissolved Kerala Congress (Thomas) and revived Kerala Congress

PC Thomas contested from Kottayam (Lok Sabha constituency) for NDA on 2019 Indian general election

In October 2020, it was reported that P. C. Thomas was leaving NDA and was likely to join the United Democratic Front (UDF). The party however decided to stay in the NDA and extended their support to NDA candidates in the 2020 Kerala local elections.

Kerala Congress (P.J Joseph Era 2.0) (2021- Present) 
Since 2016 to 2021 Kerala Congress was in an alliance with National Democratic Alliance (NDA)

On 2021 March 17 the party left the National Democratic Alliance (NDA) later Kerala Congress (Joseph), which is part of the Congress-led United Democratic Front (UDF) merged into bracket less Kerala Congress. which Makes P. J. Joseph as Kerala Congress Party Chairman Again

2021 Kerala Legislative Assembly election 
After the merger with Kerala Congress, PJ Joseph and Mons Joseph resigned from MLA post to avoid the technicalities regarding the Anti-Defection Law as they had won the assembly election in 2016 in Kerala Congress (M) tickets
However, 8 out of 10 candidates of Kerala Congress lost in elections, only P. J. Joseph and Mons Joseph were re-elected to the legislative assembly from Thodupuzha and Kaduthuruthy respectively.

Party Organisation

Leadership
On April 27 a meeting convened online by the party leadership in Thodupuzha and chooses P.J Joseph as party chairman and PC Thomas as working chairman., Mons Joseph has been elected as the executive chairman., Francis George Johnny Nelloor and Thomas unniyadan as deputy chairman, while Joy Abraham is the secretary-general.

Notable leaders of Kerala Congress
K. M. George 
Mathachan Kuruvinakunnel
R Balakrishna Pillai
E John Jacob
K R Saraswathy Amma 
Vayala Idikula 
P. J. Joseph
P. C. Thomas
Mons Joseph
C. F. Thomas
Francis George 
Johnny Nellore
Thomas Unniyadan
Joy Abraham

References

External links

Congress
 
Political parties established in 1964
1964 establishments in Kerala